The Explore the Pocono Mountains 225 is a NASCAR Xfinity Series stock car race held at Pocono Raceway.

History

The inaugural Xfinity Series race at Pocono was held on June 4, 2016 with a scheduled distance of 100 laps/. However, the race was shortened after only 53 laps/ because of persistent rain showers. The race marked the first time NASCAR's second-tier series visited and raced in the state of Pennsylvania since the closure of Nazareth Speedway in 2004. The second running of the event was the first NASCAR-sanctioned event at Pocono to use the stage format, a format that was created prior to the 2017 NASCAR season for all three divisions for all race tracks; the 100 laps were split into three stages, with the first two being 25 laps each and the last consisting of the final 50.

In 2020, the distance was reduced to 225 miles and 90 laps—with the first two stage lengths being reduced to 20 laps—as the race was held on Sunday in support of the NASCAR Cup Series' second round of a Pocono doubleheader.

In 2022, the race was moved from June to July and the Pocono Mountains Visitors Bureau, which was previously the title sponsor of one of the track's Cup Series races, replaced J.P. Mascaro & Sons as the title sponsor of the race. Like they did with the Cup Series race name, the PMVB replaced their own name in the name of the race with "Explore the Pocono Mountains".

Past winners           

 2016: Race shortened due to rain.
 2019 & 2020: Races extended due to NASCAR overtime.

Multiple winners (teams)

Manufacturer wins

References

External links
 

 
NASCAR Xfinity Series races
2016 establishments in Pennsylvania
Recurring sporting events established in 2016
Annual sporting events in the United States